Brand New Sin was a hard rock/Southern rock band from Syracuse, New York.

History
Brand New Sin's first radio hit was the song "My World". They had been recording and touring the USA and UK since 2002 alongside many big national bands such as Motorhead, Corrosion Of Conformity, Saliva, Breaking Benjamin, SOil, Type O Negative, Clutch, Mushroomhead, The Cult and more. They have opened for Slash, Godsmack, Dope, Chris Cornell, Deftones, Drowning Pool, Audiovent, Dillinger Escape Plan, and many others. In 2005, they toured to support their first Century Media release, Recipe For Disaster with Black Label Society.

In 2006, the band released their third studio album titled Tequila. That same year, they also recorded Big Show's theme song "Crank It Up" for WWE Wreckless Intent. The single My World was also featured on Chuck Liddell's "The Ultimate Iceman" DVD for UFC, as well as being used in promos for Batista's in his final months in the WWE.
 
Brand New Sin performed at the 12th annual KRockathon (a one-day music festival presented by the Syracuse, New York radio station WKLL). It was held on July 21, 2007 at the Cayuga County Fair Speedway.

Original lead singer Joe Altier, now widely known in Central New York as "Just Joe", and current front man for Elephant Mountain, left the band to pursue other interests in early 2008. They found singer Joe Sweet, former and current singer for Utica, NY band Nine Ball, to replace Altier and did some brief touring in 2008. Early in 2009 Joe Sweet decided to focus on his family and his many personal endeavors. Founding member and guitarist Kenny Dunham also parted ways with BNS in 2009. Kris Wiechmann tracked the vocals for this recording.

Shortly after Dunham's departure, the band approached Ron Keck, founder and co-owner of Subcat Studios in Skaneateles, New York, to record a few songs that the band had been sitting on. Keck agreed, and after hearing the band lay two or three tracks, Ron told the band to keep rolling. Since the band was sitting on a lot of material, some new material and some dating back to songs written by Wiechmann and Dunham that never made it to the Recipe for Disaster CD, the band was obliged to keep the "tape rolling" and to record more. On July 8, 2009 Brand New Sin independently released their latest studio album, Distilled which is their first album to feature Kris Wiechmann on lead vocals.

The band took their time in finding "the right guy" to replace longtime guitarist Kenny Dunham. Tommy Matkowski, former guitar player for Born Again Rebels, stepped up to take his place in early 2010.

On December 7, 2018, the band announced they would be reuniting to play a concert in their hometown of Syracuse, NY in 2019 with all original members.

At the May 4th, 2019 reunion show; a second show was announced.  Brand New Sin will perform August 25th, 2019, on the Great New York State Fair's Experience Stage as part of the Chevrolet Music Festival.

Discography

Studio albums
 Brand New Sin (2002) Now or Never, Century Media (re-release)  
 Recipe For Disaster (2005) Century Media 
 Tequila (2006) Century Media 
 Distilled (2009) Independent
 United State (2011) Goomba Music
 Live At The Lost (August 2019) Independent

Singles and EPs
 Black And Blue (2005) Century Media

Members

Current members
 Joe Altier: vocals (2001-2008, 2018-present)
 Kris Wiechmann: guitar, vocals (2001-present)
 Chuck Kahl: bass (2001-present)
 Kenny Dunham: guitars (2001-2009, 2018-present)
 Brian "Slider" Azzoto: guitar, vocals (2001-2004, 2018-present)
 Mike Rafferty: drums (2001) (2018-present)

Former Members
 Joe Sweet: vocals (2008–2009) (ex-Nine Ball)
 Tommy Matkowski: guitar (2010-    )
 Kevin Dean: drums

References

External links
 Official website

Hard rock musical groups from New York (state)
Heavy metal musical groups from New York (state)
Musical groups from Syracuse, New York
Musical groups established in 2002
American southern rock musical groups